Wyndham Guise (né William Windham Guise Cutler) was a British actor who appeared on stage in Edwardian musical comedies beginning in the 1890s and became a film actor during the silent era. He is sometimes credited as Windham Guise.

Selected filmography
 The House of Temperley (1913)
 The Bosun's Mate (1914)
 Trilby (1914)
 She Stoops to Conquer (1914)
 The Firm of Girdlestone (1915)
 Sally in Our Alley (1916)
 Dr. Wake's Patient (1916)
 The Lyons Mail (1916)
 Diana and Destiny (1916)
 Tom Jones (1917)
 Little Women (1917)
 A Turf Conspiracy (1918)
 A Fortune at Stake (1918)
 Democracy (1918)
 Mrs. Thompson (1919)
 Convict 99 (1919) - Mr Lucas
 The Pride of the Fancy (1920) - Sir Rufus Douglas
 The Pursuit of Pamela (1920)
 General John Regan (1921)
 The Princess of New York (1921)
 For Her Father's Sake (1921)
 Mr. Pim Passes By (1921)
 The Game of Life (1922)
 Her Redemption (1924)
 The Qualified Adventurer (1925)
 When Giants Fought (1926)
 Thou Fool (1926)
 Carry On (1927)
 His House in Order (1928)
 Cupid in Clover (1929)

References

External links
 

1859 births
1934 deaths
English male stage actors
English male film actors
English male silent film actors
19th-century English male actors
20th-century English male actors
Male actors from London
English male musical theatre actors